The 1988–89 season was the 76th season in the history of FC St. Pauli. They competed in the Bundesliga, the top tier of German football, and the DFB-Pokal. It was the club's second season in the Bundesliga and first following their promotion from the 2. Bundesliga in the 1987–88 season.

Competitions

Bundesliga

League table

Matches

DFB-Pokal

Appearances and goals

Notes

References

1988–89
German football clubs 1988–89 season